Belfast Grand Central station (formerly the Belfast Transport Hub until 7 April 2022) is a proposed integrated bus and railway station serving the city centre of Belfast, Northern Ireland. It is situated in a new neighbourhood known as Weaver's Cross. The interchange is currently under construction and will replace Great Victoria Street railway station and the Europa Buscentre. It is expected to open in 2024/2025.

Context 
The first railway station in Ulster was opened on the site of today's Great Victoria Street station in 1839. It became the northern terminus of the GNR's non-stop Dublin–Belfast express in 1947, and in 1962, having been taken over by the Ulster Transport Authority (UTA), platform 5 was closed, filled in, and turned into a bus station providing a truly integrated bus-rail station for the first time in Belfast's history. Northern Ireland Railways (NIR) closed the railway part of the station altogether in 1976 and the original buildings disappeared beneath the Europa Hotel and Great Northern Mall. Railway services resumed, however, in 1995 with the opening of the present-day Great Victoria Street station, integrated with the Europa Buscentre, yards away from the site of the original 1839 station.

 Belfast Grand Central Station will not be on strictly the same site as today's Great Victoria Street Station, instead being in the corner of the Grosvenor Road and Durham Street, occupying an  site. Historically this area was occupied by the railway goods yard, until goods traffic ended in 1976, and at present is partly used as the bus depot.

Belfast Grand Central Station thus fits into a history of bus-rail integration linked to the Great Victoria Street area that goes back to 1962, save for a 19-year interruption between 1976 and 1995.

Proposal 
 
The new station is located on a  site owned by Translink between the current Europa Buscentre and Belfast Great Victoria Street railway station, both of which it replaces. The station's capacity is designed to cater for fourteen million passenger journeys annually, more than the eight million combined capacity of the pre-existing bus and railway station. In addition to rail and bus improvements, the station will also have cycle and taxi provision for enhanced connectivity, with a potential 300 cycle parking spaces. Upon completion it is said to be the "largest integrated transport facility on the island of Ireland". The proposal is described as the Northern Ireland Executive's "flagship project".

Railway station 
The new station would have eight platforms (double that of Great Victoria Street) under a large overall roof, composed of four island platforms with two faces each. Two of these islands would be short, covered entirely by the roof, and two long. Like the current Great Victoria Street, it will be the terminus of NIR's Derry, Larne, Bangor and Newry lines. The Enterprise will be moved from Lanyon Place as part of the project, meaning the flagship express service between Belfast and Dublin will terminate here. Unlike at Lanyon Place, there will be a dedicated Enterprise lounge.

Bus station 
Like the present Europa Buscentre, the new station will have stands for Ulsterbus, Goldline and Metro buses. However, the number of stands will be increased from Europa's 18 to 26. There will be a dedicated lounge for Goldliner passengers.

Weaver's Cross 
The area surrounding the hub will become a new neighbourhood which Translink has named ''Weaver's Cross''. This 100,000m2 site will comprise leisure, residential and commercial facilities. Some of the proposals for the neighbourhood were described as "bleak" due to the plan's use of tall buildings and little space in between, with Belfast's Orange Order being among the objectors.

Station Quarter 
Weaver's Cross, combined with the station and a rejuvenated Glengall Street, Hope Street and Durham Street, will become Station Quarter, Belfast's ninth Cultural Quarter.

Progress 
 
The next stage of development from February 2021, involves the relocating of bus engineering and operation facilities to new accommodation, and the construction of a new bus wash facility, engineering garage, storage facilities and a bus parking area. The Main Works and Infrastructure enhancement phases of the project are expected to be conducted in 2022. The project is due for completion in 2024/2025. The project is said to potentially create 400 jobs over a five-year period.

The main works of the project would be delivered by a joint venture of Farrans and Sacyr, with railway system works by Babcock.

Translink promotes the project using the local expression "It's Grand".

On 27 Sept 2022, Infrastructure Minister John O'Dowd appears on in video on Translink (Northern Ireland)'s YouTube channel where he discusses the major milestones that have been achieved in the construction of the new station.

On 17 October 2022, Translink uploaded another video to their YouTube channel showcasing a time-lapse of the new 'busway bridge' being partially constructed by using an 800 tonne crane to lift the 480 tonne structural steel for the bridge into place. This bridge will allow busses leaving the bus stands to cross the railway line and exit onto the A12 'Westlink'.

On 22 November 2022, Translink posted on their Instagram page with some 'trivia' relating to the busway bridge. In the post they explained how the steel was constructed for the bridge among other facts, they went on to say that the concrete deck of the bridge will be completed in early 2023, with the entire busway bridge being completed later on in 2023.

Controversies 
Though the project is still in its early days a few issues have arisen, including:
 The demolition of the ''Boyne Bridge'', which has particularly upset the residents of Sandy Row. In a June 2022 meeting, a majority of the 120 objections to the Weaver's Cross redevelopment plan concerned the removal of the bridge.
 The lack of integration with the new Glider rapid transport system, criticised as a missed opportunity for the transport hub nature of Grand Central.

References

External links

Proposed buildings and structures in Northern Ireland
Proposed railway stations in Northern Ireland